FK Resnik is a football club based in Belgrade, Serbia. It was founded in 1937.

External links
 Official site
 Club profile and squad Club Profile.

Resnik
Association football clubs established in 1937
1937 establishments in Serbia
Rakovica, Belgrade